In the United States, Southern Unionists were white Southerners living in the Confederate States of America opposed to secession. Many fought for the Union during the Civil War. These people are also referred to as Southern Loyalists, Union Loyalists, or Lincoln's Loyalists. Pro-Confederates in the South derided them as "Tories" (in reference to the pro-Crown Loyalists of the American Revolution). During Reconstruction, these terms were replaced by "scalawag" (or "scallywag"), which covered all Southern whites who supported the Republican Party.

Tennessee (especially East Tennessee), North Carolina, and Virginia (which included West Virginia at that time) were home to the largest populations of unionists. Other (primarily Appalachian) areas with significant Unionist influence included North Alabama, North Georgia, Western North Carolina, the Texas Hill Country, northern Loudoun County in Virginia, the State of Scott in Tennessee, the Free State of Jones in Mississippi, North Mississippi, North Texas, the Arkansas Ozarks, and the Boston Mountains in Arkansas. These areas provided thousands of volunteers for Union military service. Western North Carolinians, for example, formed their own loyalist infantry, cavalry, and artillery regiments, while West Virginians formed a new Union state admitted in 1863.

Description
The term Southern Unionist, and its variations, incorporate a spectrum of beliefs and actions. Some, such as Texas governor Sam Houston, were vocal in their support of Southern interests, but believed that those interests could best be maintained by remaining in the Union as it existed. Some Unionists initially opposed secession (especially in the states of Tennessee, North Carolina, and Virginia), but afterward either actively served and fought with the Confederate armies, or supported the Confederacy in other ways. Others refused to fight, went North or stayed North to enlist in the Union Army, or fought informally as partisans in the South. Some remained in the South and tried to stay neutral. The term could also be used for any Southerner who worked with the Republican Party or Union government in any capacity after the war ended in 1865.

A study of Southern Unionists in Alabama who continued to support the Union during the war found that they were typically "old fashioned" or "Jackson" conservative Democrats, or former Whigs, who viewed the federal government as worthy of defending because it had provided economic and political security. They saw secession as dangerous, illegitimate, and contrary to the intentions of the Founding Fathers, and believed that the Confederacy could not improve on the United States government. The desire for security was a motivation for Unionist slaveholders, who feared that secession would cause a conflict that would result in the loss of their slaves; however, some stated that they would rather give up slavery than dissolve the Union. The Southern ideals of honor, family, and duty were as important to Unionists as to their pro-secession neighbors. They believed, however, that rebelling against the United States, which many of their ancestors had fought for in 1776 and 1812, was the unmanly and dishonorable act.

Baggett study
In 2003, historian James Alex Baggett profiled more than 1,400 Southern political activists (742 Southern Unionists, and 666 Redeemers who eventually replaced them) in three regions (the Upper South, the Southeast, and the Southwest). He coded them as follows:

Baggett claimed that each activist's score was roughly proportional to the probability that the activist was a Southern Unionist. Baggett further investigated the lives of those Southern Unionists before, during, and after the war, with respect to birthplace, occupation, value of estate, slave ownership, education, party activity, stand on secession, war politics, and postwar politics.

History
Before the war there was widespread belief in the North that the states that had not yet seceded might be persuaded to stay within the Union. This idea was predicated on the fact that many believed that the newly elected President Lincoln would declare a relaxed policy toward the South that would ease tensions. Given the fact that there were a good number of Southern Unionists known to be found in the South it was hoped that this deliberate policy of non-provocation would subvert extremists from irreversible action. Admirable though their sentiments might have been, the claims of these Northerners were greatly embellished. In fact, there were fewer Unionists in the South than many Northerners believed, and they tended to be concentrated in areas such as northwest Virginia, East Tennessee, and parts of North Carolina where slave owners and slaves themselves were few. Furthermore, in the states that had already seceded, irreversible action had already taken place; federal buildings, mints, and courthouses had been seized.

Many Southern soldiers remained loyal when their states seceded; 40% of Virginian officers in the United States military, for example, stayed with the Union. During the war, many Southern Unionists went North and joined the Union armies. Others joined when Union armies entered their hometowns in Tennessee, Virginia, Arkansas, Louisiana, and elsewhere. Around 100,000 Southern Unionists served in the Union Army during the Civil War, and every Southern state except South Carolina raised organizations of white troops.

The Southern Unionists were referred to in Henry Clay Work's song Marching Through Georgia:

Yes and there were Union men who wept with joyful tears,When they saw the honored flag they had not seen for years;Hardly could they be restrained from breaking forth in cheers,While we were marching through Georgia.

Southern Unionists were extensively used as anti-guerrilla forces and as occupation troops in areas of the Confederacy occupied by the Union. Ulysses S. Grant noted:

Prominent Southern Unionists

Alabama
 Joseph G. Sanders
 William Hugh Smith

Arkansas
 William Meade Fishback
 Isaac Murphy

Delaware
 William Cannon

Florida
 Ossian Bingley Hart

Georgia
 Joshua Hill
 Montgomery C. Meigs

Kentucky
 Robert Anderson
 Thomas E. Bramlette
 Robert Jefferson Breckinridge
 Samuel L. Casey
 Cassius Clay
 John J. Crittenden
 Garrett Davis
 George W. Dunlap
 Henry Grider
 Aaron Harding
 John Marshall Harlan
 Joseph Holt
 James S. Jackson
 Robert Mallory
 John W. Menzies
 James Speed and Joshua Fry Speed
 William H. Wadsworth

Louisiana
 John Edward Bouligny
 Benjamin Flanders
 Michael Hahn
 James Madison Wells

Mississippi
 Stephen Duncan
 Newton Knight

North Carolina
 Henry H. Bell
 John Gibbon
 William Woods Holden
 John Pool
 Fabius Stanly
 John A. Winslow

South Carolina
 Francis Lieber
 James L. Petigru

Tennessee
 George Washington Bridges
 William Gannaway Brownlow
 Andrew Jackson Clements
 William Crutchfield
 Emerson Etheridge
 David Farragut
 Fielding Hurst
 Andrew Johnson
 George Washington Kirk
 Horace Maynard
 Thomas Amos Rogers Nelson
 James G. Spears

Texas
 Edmund J. Davis
 Edward Degener
 Thomas H. DuVal
 Andrew Jackson Hamilton
 Sam Houston
 Elisha M. Pease

Virginia
 John Minor Botts
 Lemuel J. Bowden
 John S. Carlile
 Philip St. George Cooke
 Samuel Phillips Lee
 Samuel C. Means
 Lewis McKenzie
 Winfield Scott
 Joseph Segar
 William Terrill
 George Henry Thomas
 Charles H. Upton
 Elizabeth Van Lew

West Virginia
 Jacob B. Blair
 Arthur I. Boreman
 William G. Brown Sr.
 Sherrard Clemens
 John J. Davis
 Chester D. Hubbard
 Francis Harrison Pierpont
 Kellian Whaley
 Waitman T. Willey

See also

Notes

References

 
 
 
 
 
 Fleming, Walter L. (1906). Documentary History of Reconstruction: Political, Military, Social, Religious, Educational, and Industrial. 2 vols. Uses broad collection of primary sources; vol. 1 on national politics; vol. 2 on states.
 Foner, Eric (2009). Give Me Liberty! An American History, second ed.
 
 Garner, James Wilford (1901). Reconstruction in Mississippi. Dunning school monograph.
 Holden, William Woods (1911).  Memoirs of W. W. Holden. North Carolina Scalawag governor.
 Keegan, John (2009). The American Civil War: A Military History. Random House.

External links
 Excerpts from The Southern Loyalist
 Southerners Against Secession: The Arguments of the Constitutional Unionists in 1850–51

 
American Civil War political groups
Reconstruction Era